John Joseph Condon (9 September 1909 – 1 January 1967) was a former male tennis player from South Africa.

In 1924 Condon and his compatriot partner Ivie Richardson competed in the men's doubles event at the 1924 Summer Olympics in Paris and reached the semifinal, defeating the American team of R. Norris Williams and Watson Washburn in the quarterfinal. In the semifinal they were defeated in four sets by the French team of Jacques Brugnon and Henri Cochet and in the bronze medal match lost in straight sets to René Lacoste and Jean Borotra.
 
Condon won the singles title of the South African Championships in 1926, defeating compatriot Cecil Blackbeard in three straight sets,  and was a finalist in 1923, losing to Louis Raymond.

In 1927 and 1933 he played in five ties for the South African Davis Cup team. The best team result during that period was reaching the semifinal of the European Zone in 1927 against France. South Africa lost the semifinal, played at Devonshire Park in Eastbourne, England 0–5 against the French team consisting of the famous Four Musketeers Lacoste, Borotra, Cochet and Brugnon. Condon had a Davis Cup match record of six wins vs. five losses.

Single titles
 1925 : The Rand Championships (Johannesburg)
 1926 : South African Championships (Johannesburg)

References

External links
 
 

1903 births
1967 deaths
Tennis players from Johannesburg
Transvaal Colony people
South African male tennis players
Olympic tennis players of South Africa
Tennis players at the 1924 Summer Olympics
White South African people